Yevgeny Valeryevich Leshko (born 24 June 1996) is a Belarusian professional football player currently playing for Neman Grodno.

References

External links
 
 
 Profile at Neman website

1996 births
Living people
Belarusian footballers
Association football defenders
FC Neman Grodno players
FC Lida players